Coralliodrilus is a genus of clitellate oligochaete worms.

Species 
The World Register of Marine Species recognizes the following species in the genus Coralliodrilus:

 Coralliodrilus abjornseni (Michaelsen, 1907) 
 Coralliodrilus aequalis Erséus & Davis, 1989
 Coralliodrilus amissus Arslan, Timm & Erséus, 2007
 Coralliodrilus angustiductus Erséus, 1993
 Coralliodrilus artabrensis Martinez-Ansemil & Caramelo, 2009
 Coralliodrilus atriobifidus Erséus, 1981
 Coralliodrilus bidentatus Erséus, 1993
 Coralliodrilus corpulentus Erséus, 1986
 Coralliodrilus giacobbei Erséus, 1982
 Coralliodrilus hamatilis Erséus, 1984
 Coralliodrilus hanleyi Erséus, 1997
 Coralliodrilus improvisus Erséus, 1997
 Coralliodrilus kirkmani Erséus, 1990
 Coralliodrilus leviatriatus Erséus, 1979
 Coralliodrilus longiductus Erséus, 1983
 Coralliodrilus mirus Erséus, 1990
 Coralliodrilus mollis Erséus, 1993
 Coralliodrilus oviatriatus Erséus, 1981
 Coralliodrilus parvigenitalis Erséus, 1981
 Coralliodrilus priscus Erséus & Milligan, 1992
 Coralliodrilus randyi Erséus, 1990
 Coralliodrilus regius Erséus, 1990
 Coralliodrilus rugosus Erséus, 1990
 Coralliodrilus statutus Erséus, 1982
 Coralliodrilus tyndariensis Erséus, 1982
 Coralliodrilus unicus Erséus, 1993

References

Further reading
Erséus, Christer. "Aspects of the phylogeny of the marine Tubificidae."Hydrobiologia 115.1 (1984): 37–44.

External links
WORMS

Invertebrates of Central America
Tubificina
Annelid genera
Taxa named by Christer Erséus